Lincolnshire was a county constituency of the Parliament of the United Kingdom, which returned two Members of Parliament (MP) to the House of Commons from 1290 until 1832.

History 
The constituency consisted of the historic county of Lincolnshire, excluding the city of Lincoln which had the status of a county in itself after 1409. (Although Lincolnshire contained four other boroughs, Boston, Grantham, Great Grimsby and Stamford, each of which elected two MPs in its own right for part of the period when Lincolnshire was a constituency, these were not excluded from the county constituency, and owning property within the borough could confer a vote at the county election. This was not the case, though, for Lincoln.)

As in other county constituencies the franchise between 1430 and 1832 was defined by the Forty Shilling Freeholder Act, which gave the right to vote to every man who possessed freehold property within the county valued at £2 or more per year for the purposes of land tax; it was not necessary for the freeholder to occupy his land, nor even in later years to be resident in the county at all.

Except during the period of the Commonwealth, Lincolnshire has two MPs, traditionally referred to as Knights of the Shire, elected by the bloc vote method, under which each voter had two votes. In the nominated Barebones Parliament, five members represented Lincolnshire. In the First and Second Parliaments of Oliver Cromwell's Protectorate, however, there was a general redistribution of seats and Lincolnshire elected ten members, while each of the boroughs apart from Lincoln had their representation reduced to a single MP. The traditional arrangements were restored from 1659.

At the time of the Great Reform Act in 1832, Lincolnshire had a population of approximately 317,000, though only 5,391 electors voted at the last contested election, a by-election in 1823.

Elections were held at a single polling place, Lincoln, and voters from the rest of the county had to travel to the county town to exercise their franchise. It was normal for voters to expect the candidates for whom they voted to meet their expenses in travelling to the poll, making the cost of a contested election substantial. Contested elections were therefore rare, potential candidates preferring to canvass support beforehand and usually not insisting on a vote being taken unless they were confident of winning; at all but 4 of the 29 general elections between 1701 and 1832, Lincolnshire's two MPs were elected unopposed.

The constituency was abolished in 1832 by the Great Reform Act, being divided into two two-member county divisions, Northern Lincolnshire (or The Parts of Lindsey) and Southern Lincolnshire (or The Parts of Kesteven and Holland).

Members of Parliament

MPs 1290–1640

MPs 1640–1832

Election results 
June 1818
 Hon. C. A. Pelham  3693 votes
 Sir Robert Heron  2623 votes
 Charles Chaplin Esq.  3069 votes
 Pelham and Chaplin elected. Total number of freeholders polled  5598.

See also 
 Stamford (UK Parliament list of constituencies)

References 
 D Brunton & D H Pennington, Members of the Long Parliament (London: George Allen & Unwin, 1954)
 John Cannon, Parliamentary Reform 1640–1832 (Cambridge: Cambridge University Press, 1973)
 Cobbett's Parliamentary history of England, from the Norman Conquest in 1066 to the year 1803 (London: Thomas Hansard, 1808) 
 J Holladay Philbin, Parliamentary Representation 1832 – England and Wales (New Haven: Yale University Press, 1965)
 Edward Porritt and Annie G Porritt, The Unreformed House of Commons (Cambridge University Press, 1903)
 British History Online – Parliamentary papers
 
 Poll Book, 1818. pub. W. Brooke, Lincoln (1818). See extracts.
 Willement’s roll of arms

Notes 

Parliamentary constituencies in Lincolnshire (historic)
Constituencies of the Parliament of the United Kingdom established in 1290
Constituencies of the Parliament of the United Kingdom disestablished in 1832